Best Of is a greatest hits album by Swedish alternative rock band Kent. The album was released on 16 September 2016 by RCA Records and Sony Music. It features 20 previously released tracks and four new studio recordings.

Track listing

Charts

Weekly charts

Year-end charts

References

2016 albums
Kent (band) albums
Swedish-language albums